Syrian hamster behavior refers to the ethology of the Syrian hamster (Mesocricetus auratus).

Sleeping habits
Syrian hamsters have a sleep cycle that lasts about 10 to 12 minutes.

In the laboratory, Syrian hamsters are observed to be nocturnal and in their natural circadian rhythm they wake and sleep on a consistent schedule. In all kinds of laboratory settings hamsters do 80% of their routine activities at night. Hamsters are most active early in the night, then become less active as the night passes.

A study of Syrian hamsters in the wild found that they were active almost exclusively in the daytime, which is a surprising difference from behavior in the laboratory. The sleeping behavior of wild hamsters is not well understood.

Reproduction
The female Syrian hamster has anatomic features that are unique from other animals. They mature between 8–10 weeks of age and have a 4-day estrous cycle.

Female Syrian hamsters show mate preference before they engage in copulation by displaying vaginal marking, known to solicit males. She often chooses to mate with an alpha male, who will flank mark (a scent-marking behaviour associated with aggression and competition) more frequently than any subordinate males present.

Male offspring are at higher risk than female offspring of enduring effects from maternal social stress. In the presence of a dominant pregnant female, subordinate pregnant female hamsters have the ability to reabsorb or spontaneously abort their young (most often males) in utero. The subordinate females produce smaller litters overall, and any male offspring they do produce will be smaller in size than those that were produced by the dominant female. After a mother hamster gives birth, normal behavior from the mother in the postpartum period can include establishing a maternal bond with the babies, the mother being aggressive to protect the babies, or infanticide in rodents of the mother to her young.

The male Syrian hamster has a requirement for both hormonal cues and chemosensory cues in order to engage in copulation. Further, the integration of steroid cues (i.e. testosterone) and odour cues (relayed through the olfactory bulb) is crucial for mating. It has also been shown that within the medial amygdala, the anterior and posterior regions work together to process the stimuli (odors), showing that their mating behaviour relies on the main olfactory system's communication to nuclei in the amygdala regions. Their behaviour has demonstrated this phenomenon, as they are attracted to the odor of female hamster's vaginal discharge. Males have even demonstrated mounting behaviour on other males who are scented with the female vaginal discharge.

When one male and two females are placed in the same environment, the male is likely to engage in copulation with both females as it provides him with a reproductive advantage. In all observed scenarios where there was one male and two females, he did not demonstrate preference for either female and engaged in copulation with both the females present. There has been no reproductive disadvantage to the female when another female is present, other than decreased stimulation as compared to a one-male one-female situation.

Interactions with others

Syrian hamsters acquire learned helplessness when they are bullied a few times by larger animal. Syrian hamsters can regain lost confidence when some time passes without experiencing bullying.

Interactions between male and female Syrian hamsters are influenced by the estrous cycle - in addition, their behaviour changes over the course of the 4-day cycle. Parameters for interactions that have been studied include sniffing, approaching, leaving, and following each other (male/female pair). Specific to the male hamster, his response to the female can be measured by mounting behaviour, intromission and ejaculation.

Under semi-natural conditions, the mating behaviours of male and female hamsters were observed during the 4-day period of estrous. When they were allowed free interaction, females displayed lordosis in their own living area 93% of the time, where after 60 minutes of copulation the male would be driven out by the female while she retrieved his food supply and forced him into a corner farthest away from her nest via displays of aggressive behaviour.

When a Syrian hamster is introduced to a stranger hamster in its own cage, they perform a standard sequence of acts and postures (also known as a fixed action pattern) that are agonistic by nature.  It has been observed that one hamster becomes the dominant and the other becomes submissive, as shown by their posture. The stranger hamster was observed to be the dominant in the majority of situations, and the resident hamster was the submissive.

Feeding behaviour 
Food-anticipatory activity (FAA), meaning increased locomotion due to restricted feeding schedules (often found in laboratory settings), is a behaviour seen in many rodents. The Syrian hamster is one of only few exceptions to this activity.  It has been found that the arcuate nucleus, ventromedial nucleus, and dorsomedial nucleus are all involved in the presence of FAA, and that Syrian hamsters in the laboratory do not demonstrate FAA because of the presence of light and the typical light cycles used in experiments.

In a study of their food-hoarding behaviour, Syrian hamsters were given a limited access to food and expected to consume more in each sitting than they typically would. Instead, they exhibited hoarding behaviour where they took the food during the given time period and continuously ate the food that they hoarded as though they were on a free-fed schedule. This allowed them to maintain typical body weight, and mimic the adaptive feeding strategies they may use in their natural habitats.

Females have shown signs of anorexia and anxiety when separated from social interactions. Social separation of hamsters has a bias toward females, thus providing a model for the differences between sexes when experiencing anorexia and anxiety in their adulthood.

Laboratory behaviour 

Although most all hamsters display wire-gnawing behaviour in all laboratory cage sizes, it has been shown that the more restricted the cage size, the more their gnawing behaviour increases. Additionally, hamsters in smaller cages used the roof of their house as a platform more often than those in a larger cage which may suggest that they are trying to create more space for themselves within their cage.

In another study, the bedding depth of hamsters and its influence on their stress and wire-gnawing behaviour was tracked by assigning 3 groups different bedding depths - 10 cm, 40 cm, and 80 cm. This is due to the natural instinct that laboratory rodents have to dig. Hamsters who had the 10 cm deep bedding showed significantly more wire-gnawing than any others, and the 80 cm deep bedding group demonstrated no wire-gnawing behaviour. This research demonstrates the importance of having enough bedding for the hamsters to indulge their natural tendencies and have enough material to dig.

The behaviour and responses of Syrian hamsters have been observed and tested for a variety of medical-related studies as well, such as the development of the palate and incidence of cleft palate, the influence of retinoic acid on physical malformations in fetuses, immune responses to diseases like hookworm, and the effects of ingesting ethanol solution on liver composition and fatty acid accumulation.

References

Behavior
Mammal behavior
Ethology